The Holmestrandsporten Tunnel (Holmestrandsporten) is a  long double track railway tunnel which runs through Holmestrandfjellet in Sande, Holmestrand and Re in Vestfold og Telemark, Norway. It was opened for traffic on Monday 28 November 2016.

Located on the Vestfold Line, the tunnel was built as part of the  double-track high-speed segment from Holm to Nykirke.
The new Holmestrand Station is located inside the mountain in the middle of the tunnel. The total cost of the project was estimated to be 6.6 billion Norwegian Kroner upon completion. The new tunnel reduces traveling time on the Vestfold Line by five minutes.

References

Tunnels on the Vestfold Line
Holmestrand
Tunnels completed in 2016
2016 establishments in Norway
Railway tunnels in Vestfold og Telemark